SVG-edit is a web-based free and open-source vector graphics editor. It can be used to create and edit Scalable Vector Graphics (SVG) images from within a web browser, not requiring additional software installation.

Overview
SVG-edit is a cross-browser web-based, JavaScript-driven web tool, and has also been made into browser addons, such as an addon for Firefox, a Chrome extension, and a standalone widget for Opera. There's also an experimental SVG editing extension on MediaWiki that uses SVG-edit.

SVG-edit consists of two major components: svg-editor.js and svgcanvas.js. These components work cooperatively. File svgcanvas.js can be used outside of SVG-edit, allowing developers to create alternative interfaces to the canvas.

Version history
SVG-edit was first announced by Narendra Sisodiya on 6 Feb 2009 in its minimal version. Version 2.0 was developed by Pavol Rusnak and released on 3 June 2009. The current stable release is 7.2.0.

See also

 Comparison of vector graphics editors

References

External links
 SVG-edit repository at GitHub
 Archived Google Code project

Free vector graphics editors
Scalable Vector Graphics
Cross-platform software
Vector graphics editors for Linux
Software using the MIT license
Free software programmed in JavaScript